Regina Annette Taylor is an American actress and playwright. She has won several awards throughout her career, including a Golden Globe Award and NAACP Image Award. In July 2017, Taylor was announced as the new Denzel Washington Endowed Chair in Theater at Fordham University.

Early life and education
Taylor was born in Dallas, Texas. Her mother, Nell Taylor, is a social worker and poet. At the age of 12, she moved to Muskogee, Oklahoma. The family later returned to Dallas, where she graduated from L. G. Pinkston High School in 1977.

Acting

Her earliest professional acting roles were two made-for-television films while she was studying at Southern Methodist University: 1980's Nurse (1980) and Crisis at Central High (1981). In the latter movie, she was praised by critic John O'Connor of The New York Times for her portrayal of Minnijean Brown, a member of the Little Rock Nine, a group of African-American students who braved violence and armed guards to integrate Little Rock Central High School in 1957. 

Her first role to garner widespread attention was that of Mrs. Carter, the drug-addicted mother of a promising young female student, in the 1989 film Lean on Me. She became well known to the television viewing public for her role as Lilly Harper on the early 1990s TV series I'll Fly Away. This role won her a Golden Globe award for Best Actress in a Television Drama and also an NAACP Image Award for Outstanding Actress in a Drama Series. In 2018, Taylor had a role as Dr. Hannah Moshay in season 5 of the highly successful NBC crime thriller series The Blacklist.

Since then she has had some critical success for various supporting roles in films, such as the Spike Lee film Clockers, Courage Under Fire, A Family Thing, The Negotiator, and for the films Losing Isaiah and Strange Justice — a Showtime original film in which she portrayed Anita Hill — and as the lead in the PBS telefilm Cora Unashamed, based on a Langston Hughes short story. She was a cast member for all four seasons of the CBS drama The Unit. 

Taylor is also an accomplished stage actress, and was the first black woman to play Juliet in Romeo and Juliet on Broadway. Her other Broadway credits include Macbeth and As You Like It. She appeared in Off-Broadway and regional productions of such plays as Jar the Floor (Off-Broadway, 1999), Machinal (Off-Broadway, 1990), L'Illusion (Off-Broadway, 1988), and A Map of the World (Off-Broadway, Public Theatre). She appeared as "Ariel" in The Tempest at the La Jolla Playhouse, California in 1987, for which she received a Dramalogue Award.

In 2016, Taylor starred in the original pilot of Time After Time as Vanessa Anders, but was replaced by Nicole Ari Parker before the series aired, containing a new pilot with Parker.

Playwriting
Taylor is currently the writer-in-residence at the Signature Theatre, where her new play stop.reset. premiered at the Off-Broadway
Pershing Square Signature Center on September 8, 2013. Taylor also directed the production.

A Distinguished Artistic Associate of Chicago's Goodman Theatre, in 1991, Taylor co-wrote two one act plays adapted from Franz Xaver Kroetz's Sty Farm and Ghost Train with her husband, Mario Emes. It was produced by Joseph Papp at the Public Theater, New York City, was directed by Melia Bensussen and starred Mary Alice, Paul Benjamin, Paul Butler and Kenya Scott.

She wrote Escape From Paradise, a one-woman show which was produced at the Goodman Theatre Studio, Chicago, in October 1995. Her short plays Watermelon Rinds and Inside the Belly of the Beast were incorporated into a program at the Goodman Theatre Studio in 1994. She wrote and appeared in the play Millennium Mambo, a one-woman work, presented at the Goodman Theatre in February 2000. She wrote the play A Night in Tunisia, which premiered during the 2000 Alabama Shakespeare Festival.  

In 2000, Taylor won a best new play award from the American Critics' Association for Oo-Bla-Dee,  a play about 1940s female jazz musicians.  The Goodman Theatre produced the play in 1999.

She wrote and directed Crowns, which is a co-production of the McCarter Theatre, where it premiered in October 2002 and the Second Stage Theatre, produced in December 2002. Crowns is described by Playbill as a "play-with-gospel-music", and is based on the book of the same name of photographs by Michael Cunningham and journalist Craig Marberry. Crowns has been produced in various locations, including the Meroney Theater in Salisbury, North Carolina with  The Piedmont Players in May 2009; the Zach Theatre in Austin, Texas in September 2004, the Pasadena Playhouse in co-production with Ebony Repertory Theatre in July 2009; Syracuse Stage in Syracuse, New York; at the Connecticut Repertory Theatre in Storrs, Connecticut in May 2009 and at the Electric City Playhouse in Anderson, South Carolina in May 2011. Crowns was the most performed musical in the country in 2006. It won four Helen Hayes Awards (for Washington, D.C. productions), including Taylor's win for Best Direction as well as Best Regional Musical.

She wrote and directed an adaptation of Anton Chekhov's The Seagull titled Drowning Crow. Drowning Crow was produced on Broadway in February 2004  by the Manhattan Theatre Club at the Biltmore Theatre, directed by Marion McClinton.

She wrote and directed The Dreams of Sarah Breedlove, a dramatic rendering of the financial gains and emotional losses of African-American businesswoman Madam C.J. Walker, which received its world premiere production in January 2005 at the Alabama Shakespeare Festival.

Taylor's play Magnolia, set during the beginning of desegregation in Atlanta in 1963, premiered at Chicago's Goodman Theatre in March 2009 directed by Anna Shapiro. after receiving a workshop production in July 2008 at the National Playwrights' Conference at the Eugene O'Neill Theater Center in Waterford, Connecticut.

Taylor returned to the Goodman Theatre in January and February 2011 for the world premiere of her new play entitled The Trinity River Plays, a co-production with Dallas Theater Center, directed by Ethan McSweeny. The production is a trilogy composed of Jar Fly, Rain, and Ghoststory.

Taylor's 2017 play A Seat at the Table was commissioned by Carthage College's Theatre Department, the ninth play commissioned as part of their New Play Initiative. The play tells the story of the life of civil rights activist Fannie Lou Hamer. The production was invited to the 2018 region 3 Kennedy Center American College Theater Festival.

Personal life
According to a DNA analysis, she is descended, mainly, from Mende people of  Sierra Leone and of Kru people of Liberia.  Taylor is a member of Alpha Kappa Alpha sorority.

In 1982, she married artist Mario Emes in New York City.

Filmography
2023 East New York There Goes The Neighborhood episode Councilwoman

References

External links

New Plays And Playwrights - Working in the Theatre Seminar video at American Theatre Wing.org, January 2004
Regina Taylor bio at the American Theatre Wing website (2003)

American people of Sierra Leonean descent
American people of Liberian descent
African-American actresses
American film actresses
American television actresses
Best Drama Actress Golden Globe (television) winners
Living people
People from Dallas
Actresses from Oklahoma
Writers from Muskogee, Oklahoma
Actresses from Texas
African-American dramatists and playwrights
American dramatists and playwrights
American people of Kru descent
American people of Mende descent
American women dramatists and playwrights
21st-century African-American people
21st-century African-American women
20th-century African-American people
20th-century African-American women
African-American women writers
Year of birth missing (living people)